Jollyville is a neighborhood in the northern part of Austin, Texas, in the United States. In 2010 it was a census-designated place (CDP) in Travis and Williamson counties, but has since been annexed by Austin. The population of the CDP was 16,151 at the 2010 census.

History

The name, however, comes from a later settler, John G. (possibly Grey, but no proof for middle name exist) Jolly, who purchased  in 1866. John and his wife, Nancy Isabell (Guill) Jolly, operated a blacksmith shop and store. The Jollys donated land for a school and the cemetery in which they were eventually buried.
Jollyville remained lightly settled for decades; only twenty families lived in the area in 1960. Eventually, the growth of nearby Austin led to the development of Jollyville as a suburban community.

Geography

Demographics

At the 2000 census, there were 15,813 people, 5,897 households, and 4,145 families living in the CDP. The population density was 2,681.7 people per square mile (1,034.8/km2). There were 5,993 housing units at an average density of 1,016.4/sq mi (392.2/km2). The racial makeup of the area was 79.81% White, 4.69% African American, 0.31% Native American, 8.52% Asian, 0.02% Pacific Islander, 4.36% from other races, and 2.28% from two or more races. 11.43% of the population were Hispanic or Latino of any race.

Of the 5,897 households 42.2% had children under the age of 18 living with them, 57.2% were married couples living together, 9.5% had a female householder with no husband present, and 29.7% were non-families. 20.5% of households were one person and 1.6% had someone living alone who was 65 or older. The average household size was 2.68 and the average family size was 3.17.

The age distribution was 28.7% under the age of 18, 8.4% from 18 to 24, 41.3% from 25 to 44, 18.7% from 45 to 64, and 3.0% 65 or older. The median age was 32 years. For every 100 females, there were 99.8 males. For every 100 females age 18 and over, there were 98.7 males.

The median household income was $66,999 and the median family income  was $74,851. Males had a median income of $50,048 versus $32,004 for females. The per capita income for the CDP was $28,113. 2.7% of the population and 2.2% of families were living below the poverty line, including 1.7% of those under the age of 18 and 6.2% of those 65 and older.

Climate
The climate in this area is characterized by hot, humid summers and generally mild to cool winters.  According to the Köppen Climate Classification system, Jollyville has a humid subtropical climate, abbreviated "Cfa" on climate maps.

Education
Jollyville is within the Round Rock Independent School District.

Four elementary schools serve sections of the CDP: Forest North, Jollyville, Live Oak, and Pond Springs. Residents are divided between Deerpark Middle School and Pearson Ranch Middle School. All residents are zoned to McNeil High School.

Previously all residents were zoned to Deerpark Middle School.

References

External links
 
 Jollyville Elementary School in Round Rock Independent School District, Austin, TX

Census-designated places in Travis County, Texas
Census-designated places in Williamson County, Texas
Census-designated places in Texas
Census-designated places in Greater Austin